This is a glossary of terms used in the descriptions of ants.

A

B

D

E

F

G

H

M

N

O

P

Q

R

S

T

U

W

See also
Glossary of entomology terms
Glossary of scientific names
Glossary of scientific naming

References

External links
Antkey glossary

Ants
Myrmecology
Wikipedia glossaries using description lists